The Lower Bavarian Friedrichsberg is a mountain, in the southern Bavarian Forest in Germany between the villages of Breitenberg and Wegscheid in the county of Passau not far from the border with Upper Austria.

For several years a viewing tower has stood at the top, which offers an all-round view. On clear days in föhn conditions, the chain of the Alps may be seen from the Totes Gebirge to the  Kaiser Mountains. The Friedrichsberg may be climbed in a short time using one of several footpaths from the surrounding villages and hamlets.

References 

Mountains under 1000 metres
Mountains of Bavaria
Mountains of the Bavarian Forest
Passau (district)